9630 may refer to:
The year 9630, in the 10th millennium
9630 Castellion, an asteroid
John Deere 9630, a farm tractor
BlackBerry Tour, a mobile phone developed by Research In Motion